Tangiteroria is a small rural community in the North Island of New Zealand. It is located halfway between Whangārei and Dargaville on State Highway 14 on the banks of the Northern Wairoa river.

It consists of a primary school, pub (currently closed), Catholic Church (currently closed), petrol station (currently closed), marae, and a sports complex/community centre (pot luck dinner once a month on a Friday). The sports complex and community centre were destroyed by a fire in the early hours of January 16, 2020. 

The local cricket team play either Kirikopuni or Pukehuia once a week through the summer.

Kirikopuni and Pukehuia both had railway stations on the Dargaville Branch for the movement of stock throughout Northland and a passenger service.

History and culture
A Wesleyan mission station was set up by James Wallis in 1836, and then run by James Buller. The station lasted until 1853. Kauri logs were sent down the river to be milled in the mid-1860s. A flax mill operated in the late 19th century.

A steamer service up the Wairoa River was established to Tangiteroria by the Tangihua in 1878, and Watson's Landing and store flourished there in 1881. The S.S. Blanche ran a service between Dargaville and Tangiteroria in 1891-2, and the S.S. Ethel was doing the run twice a week in 1896. It was replaced by the S.S. Naumai from 1903-1920. The service finished in 1929. Road access was established in the 1890s.

Marae

The local Tangiterōria Marae and Tirarau meeting house are a traditional meeting place for the Ngāpuhi hapū of Te Parawhau and Te Uriroroi, and the Ngāti Whātua hapū of Te Kuihi and Te Parawhau.

Demographics
The SA1 area is part of the larger Maungaru statistical area.

The SA1 statistical area had a population of 204 at the 2018 New Zealand census, an increase of 36 people (21.4%) since the 2013 census, and an increase of 3 people (1.5%) since the 2006 census. There were 81 households, comprising 102 males and 99 females, giving a sex ratio of 1.03 males per female. The median age was 39.8 years (compared with 37.4 years nationally), with 48 people (23.5%) aged under 15 years, 30 (14.7%) aged 15 to 29, 99 (48.5%) aged 30 to 64, and 21 (10.3%) aged 65 or older.

Ethnicities were 88.2% European/Pākehā, 27.9% Māori, 2.9% Pacific peoples, 1.5% Asian, and 1.5% other ethnicities. People may identify with more than one ethnicity.

Although some people chose not to answer the census's question about religious affiliation, 60.3% had no religion and 23.5% were Christian.

Of those at least 15 years old, 18 (11.5%) people had a bachelor's or higher degree, and 30 (19.2%) people had no formal qualifications. The median income was $34,200, compared with $31,800 nationally. 21 people (13.5%) earned over $70,000 compared to 17.2% nationally. The employment status of those at least 15 was that 84 (53.8%) people were employed full-time, 24 (15.4%) were part-time, and 6 (3.8%) were unemployed.

Maungaru statistical area

Maungaru had a population of 1,800 at the 2018 New Zealand census, an increase of 114 people (6.8%) since the 2013 census, and an increase of 87 people (5.1%) since the 2006 census. There were 672 households, comprising 906 males and 897 females, giving a sex ratio of 1.01 males per female. The median age was 44.0 years (compared with 37.4 years nationally), with 375 people (20.8%) aged under 15 years, 276 (15.3%) aged 15 to 29, 852 (47.3%) aged 30 to 64, and 300 (16.7%) aged 65 or older.

Ethnicities were 91.8% European/Pākehā, 21.3% Māori, 2.8% Pacific peoples, 1.7% Asian, and 1.0% other ethnicities. People may identify with more than one ethnicity.

The percentage of people born overseas was 8.7, compared with 27.1% nationally.

Although some people chose not to answer the census's question about religious affiliation, 54.3% had no religion, 34.2% were Christian, 0.2% were Hindu, 0.2% were Muslim, 0.2% were Buddhist and 1.5% had other religions.

Of those at least 15 years old, 144 (10.1%) people had a bachelor's or higher degree, and 366 (25.7%) people had no formal qualifications. The median income was $29,900, compared with $31,800 nationally. 171 people (12.0%) earned over $70,000 compared to 17.2% nationally. The employment status of those at least 15 was that 744 (52.2%) people were employed full-time, 246 (17.3%) were part-time, and 45 (3.2%) were unemployed.

Education

Tangiteroria School is a coeducational full primary (years 1-8) school with a roll of  students as of  The school was established in 1886.

Notes

Kaipara District
Populated places in the Northland Region